Timber Tramps is a 1975 film directed by Tay Garnett and starring Claude Akins and Leon Ames.

It was the final film by Garnett.

Cast
Claude Akins as Matt
Leon Ames as Deacon
Eve Brent as Corey
Joseph Cotten as Greedy sawmill mogul
Cesar Romero as Greedy sawmill mogul
Patricia Medina

See also
 List of American films of 1975

References

External links

1975 films
Films directed by Tay Garnett
1970s adventure films
Films scored by Hoyt Curtin
Films set in forests
Films about lumberjacks
1970s English-language films
American adventure films
1970s American films